Neil Oliver (born 1967) is a Scottish historian.

Neil Oliver may also refer to:

Neil Oliver (footballer) (born 1967), English footballer
Neil Oliver (politician) (1933–2019), Australian politician